Destutia excelsa is a species of moth in the family Geometridae first described by Strecker in 1878. It is found in North America.

The MONA or Hodges number for Destutia excelsa is 6883.

Subspecies
Three subspecies belong to Destutia excelsa:
 Destutia excelsa excelsa (Strecker in Ruffner, 1878) i g
 Destutia excelsa olivata (Barnes & McDunnough, 1917) i
 Destutia excelsa simpliciaria (Grote, 1883) i g
Data sources: i = ITIS, c = Catalogue of Life, g = GBIF, b = BugGuide

References

Further reading

 

Ourapterygini
Articles created by Qbugbot
Moths described in 1878